The Velachery MRTS Station is a ground level station on the Chennai MRTS railway line in Chennai. It is located near the junction of Velachery Main Road and Inner Ring Road in Velachery. The station is built on the northern banks of Pallikaranai wetland.

History
The station was opened on 19 November 2007. The EMU maintenance shed at the station was opened in 2008.

Structure
The length of the platform is 280 m. The station premises also consists of 12,250 sq m of open parking area.

EMU shed
The station has a massive shed for preventive maintenance of electrical multiple unit (EMU) rakes, which is spread over 44 hectares. However, the shed has been lying in disuse for the past few years. Due to this, there are currently no mid-night services between Chennai Beach station and Velachery.

Additional infrastructure
A bus bay in front of the station, set to become the biggest in south Chennai, is under construction at a cost of  100 million, jointly executed by the Southern Railway and the state government. To be built in about 60,000 sq m of land, the depot will be owned by the state government.

A 3.4 km-long, 18 m-wide access road to Perungudi station and Taramani station is being constructed along the MRTS line from Velachery to Taramani.

Patronage
The station primarily serves the residential community of Velachery and its neighbouring suburbs such as Madipakkam, Ullagaram-Puzhuthivakkam, Adambakkam and Pallikaranai. The Velachery station receives the highest patronage among all the MRTS stations.

Developments

See also
 Chennai MRTS
 Chennai suburban railway
 Chennai Metro
 Transport in Chennai

References

Chennai Mass Rapid Transit System stations
Railway stations in Chennai
Railway stations opened in 2007

ta:வேளச்சேரி